Waka is an unincorporated community in western Ochiltree County, Texas, United States.  It lies along State Highway 15 southwest of the city of Perryton, the county seat of Ochiltree County.  Its elevation is 3,045 feet (928 m).  Although Waka is unincorporated, it has a post office, with the ZIP code of 79093; the ZCTA for ZIP code 79093 had a population of 76 at the 2000 census.

The community, initially named Wawaka, was founded by German settlers in 1885, and its post office was opened in 1901.  When another community, Burnside, was platted along the Panhandle and Santa Fe Railway 3 miles (5 km) away, Wawaka's residents and its postmaster moved to Burnside; the community was renamed Waka in 1921, two years after the Wawaka residents moved, but the post office remained "Wawaka" for six years.

In 2014, it was announced that, by March 29, the Post Office in Waka would close.  Residents were encouraged to use the postal services in Farnsworth or in Perryton.

Climate
According to the Köppen Climate Classification system, Waka has a semi-arid climate, abbreviated "BSk" on climate maps.

Education
It is within the Perryton Independent School District. On September 9, 1990, the Perryton district absorbed the Waka Independent School District.

References

External links
Community profile from the Handbook of Texas Online

Unincorporated communities in Ochiltree County, Texas
Unincorporated communities in Texas